TPC Harding Park, formerly Harding Park Golf Club and commonly known as Harding Park, is a municipal golf course on the West Coast of the United States, located in western San Francisco, California. It is owned by the city and county of 

It is now a part of the PGA Tour's Tournament Players Club (TPC) network of courses, following an agreement between the tour and the city that was announced on November 3, 2010. It is located in the southwest area of San Francisco, on the west side of San Francisco State University, and surrounded by Lake Merced on its other three sides. The entrance is at Harding Road, which connects to Skyline Boulevard on the east.

History
Harding Park Golf Course opened  on July 18, 1925. It is named after President Warren G. Harding, an avid golfer, who had died in office while visiting San Francisco two years earlier. The course covers  along the shores of Lake Merced, in the city's southwest corner. Willie Watson and Sam Whiting, who also designed the nearby Olympic Club's Lake Course, drew up a design plan for a course at Harding Park for a price of $300.

The golf course attracted national attention, hosting a number of important tournaments, including The U.S. Amateur Public Links Championship in 1937 and again in 1956. In the 1960s, Harding Park became a regular stop for the PGA Tour at the Lucky International Open. The PGA Tour left Harding Park after the San Francisco Open Invitational in 1969, due to deteriorating conditions and antiquated facilities. Course conditions worsened during the 1970s and 1980s, as the city budget cuts wreaked havoc on course maintenance. The low point came in 1998, when Harding was used as a parking lot during the U.S. Open at the nearby Lake Course of the Olympic Club.

Around the turn of the century, Sandy Tatum, a prominent San Francisco attorney, champion golfer, and former United States Golf Association president, led a campaign to restore Harding Park to its former glory. He eventually got approval from former mayor Willie Brown to allow Arnold Palmer Golf Management, a Florida-based company, to renovate and operate the park. In 2001, however, the San Francisco Board of Supervisors, namely former District 7 Supervisor Tony Hall, opposed the project based on fear that Arnold Palmer's involvement in the project represented privatization of a municipally-owned golf course. As opposition grew, Arnold Palmer backed out, primarily over concern about revenue estimates. Palmer Golf and the city could not agree on a greens fee schedule. The city's proposed management contract, at the urging of the Harding Park Men's Club, specified a percentage of tee times that would be held for city residents at a greatly reduced rate, albeit an increase over the previous rate.

When all hopes to renovate Harding Park seemed unrealistic and far fetched, Sean Elsbernd, Tony Hall's Chief of Staff helped to revive the project. He was the one who later succeeded Hall. He and Tatum convinced Hall that the renovation could be a significant revenue producer for the city, by attracting the PGA Tour back to town. They thought it would provide the adequate stimulus for the city to move forward. They also addressed funding concerns by tapping grant money from Proposition 12, a measure passed in 2000 to fund parks across California. But advocacy groups such as the Neighborhood Parks Council continued to oppose the project, claiming that renovating the golf course was not a priority for the city, and that those state grants should be used to help improve other recreation facilities across town. Despite opposition, the San Francisco Board of Supervisors unanimously passed the resolution to use Prop. 12 money in 2001, citing potential revenue for the city, should Harding become a regular host of professional golf events.

Renovation finally began in the spring of 2002. The course property remained under the ownership of the city and county of San Francisco. The city's parks and recreation department is responsible for course maintenance, which remains an ongoing concern, for everyday players as well as for PGA Tour officials looking to conduct future events at the course.

Before the 2010 deal with the PGA Tour that made Harding Park a member of the TPC network, Kemper Sports operated the course, including the pro shop and tee-time reservations. Following the deal, which lasted through the spring of 2010, the course is now operated by the tour's Golf Course Properties arm for no management fee. Facilities have become world class and include a modern clubhouse and restaurant capable of hosting special events, and a full-sized practice range. The renovation budget also covered the park's picturesque and challenging nine-hole layout, The Fleming 9, named for John Fleming, the long-time San Francisco Parks' superintendent. The fee schedule includes a substantial discount for San Francisco city residents, and a smaller discount for residents of Bay Area counties.

On August 22, 2003, the Harding Park Golf Course was officially reopened. Since the renovation's completion, Harding Park has hosted several men's professional golf tournaments.

Tournaments hosted
Having hosted the PGA Tour's Lucky International Open from 1961 to 1969, Harding Park did not see elite tournament golf again until 2005 when it hosted the WGC-American Express Championship. Following that event, an agreement between the city and the PGA Tour was reached whereby several more PGA Tour events were scheduled to be played at Harding Park; The course hosted the 2009 Presidents Cup, the 2015 WGC-Cadillac Match Play, the 2020 PGA Championship, and is scheduled to host the 2026 President's Cup. Harding Park has also hosted the Champions Tour's season-ending Charles Schwab Cup Championship in 2010, 2011, and 2013.

Scorecard

References

External links

Golf clubs and courses in California
Parks in San Francisco
Sports venues in San Francisco
1925 establishments in California
Presidents Cup venues
Sports venues completed in 1925